Duke of Gloucester is a British royal title (after Gloucester), often conferred on one of the sons of the reigning monarch. The first four creations were in the Peerage of England and the last in the Peerage of the United Kingdom; the current creation carries with it the subsidiary titles of Earl of Ulster and Baron Culloden.

The title was first conferred on Thomas of Woodstock, the thirteenth child of King Edward III. The title became extinct at his death, as it did upon the death of the duke of the second creation, Humphrey of Lancaster, fourth son of King Henry IV.

The title was next conferred on Richard, brother to King Edward IV. When Richard himself became king, the dukedom merged into the crown. After Richard's death, the title was considered ominous, since the first three such dukes had all died without issue to inherit their titles. The title was not awarded for over 150 years: the next to receive the dukedom was the son of King Charles I, Henry Stuart, upon whose death the title again became extinct.

Prince William, son of the future Queen Anne, was styled "Duke of Gloucester" for his whole life (1689–1700), but was never formally created duke. Frederick, Prince of Wales, was styled "Duke of Gloucester" from 1718–1726, but was then created Duke of Edinburgh rather than of Gloucester.

There was next a creation of a double dukedom (not two dukedoms) for the brother of King George III, Prince William Henry, his proper title becoming "Duke of Gloucester and Edinburgh".

The fifth and most recent creation was for Prince Henry, third son of King George V, styled as His Royal Highness The Duke of Gloucester. Upon Prince Henry's death, the dukedom was inherited by his only surviving son Prince Richard, who still holds the title. The heir-apparent to the title is Alexander Windsor, styled Earl of Ulster. The next in the line of succession is the Earl of Ulster's son Xan Windsor, known by his grandfather's third title of Lord Culloden.
The royal dukedom will devolve into an ordinary one when inherited by Alexander Windsor; as a great-grandson of a sovereign he is not entitled to royal style, and will be styled as His Grace The Duke of Gloucester.

Dukes of Gloucester

First creation, 1385–1397

| Thomas of WoodstockHouse of Plantagenet1385–1397also: Duke of Aumale (1385–1397), Earl of Essex (1376–1397), Earl of Buckingham (1377) ||  || 7 January 1355Woodstock Palaceson of Edward III of England and Queen Philippa || Eleanor de Bohun13765 children || 8 September 1397Calaisaged 42
|-
|colspan=5|Thomas of Woodstock's son died two years after his father, but never succeeded to his titles except that of Earl of Buckingham. At the time of Thomas's death, he was regarded as a traitor and thus his titles were forfeit after his murder (except Earl of Buckingham). His son had no issue and his male line died out in 1399.
|-
|}

Second creation, 1414–1447

| Humphrey of LancasterHouse of Lancaster1414–1447also: Earl of Pembroke (1414) ||  || 3 October 1390Lancaster Castleson of Henry IV of England and Mary de Bohun || Jacqueline, Countess of Hainaut1422–1428 (annulled)1 child (stillborn)Eleanor de Cobham1428–1441 (annulled)2 children || 23 February 1447Bury St Edmundsaged 56
|-
|colspan=5|Before marrying Humphrey, Eleanor de Cobham was his mistress. At the time of Humphrey's 1447 death, he had two children, Arthur and Antigone. However, both children were born before his marriage to Eleanor and were thus illegitimate and could not succeed to his titles.
|-
|}

Third creation, 1461

| Richard PlantagenetHouse of York1461–1483
| 
| 2 October 1452Fotheringhay Castle, Oundleson of Richard, Duke of York and Cecily Neville
| Anne Neville1472–1485(her death)1 child
| 22 August 1485Bosworth Fieldaged 32
|-
|colspan=5|Richard succeeded as Richard III in 1483 upon his nephew's disappearance, and his titles merged with the crown.
|-
|}

Fourth creation, 1659

| Henry StuartHouse of Stuart1659–1660also: Earl of Cambridge (1659) 
| 
| 8 July 1640Oatlands Palace, Oatlandsson of King Charles I and Queen Henrietta Maria
| Never married
| 18 September 1660Whitehall, Londonaged 20
|-
|}

Only styled, 1689

| Prince WilliamHouse of Oldenburg1689–1700
| 
| 24 July 1689Hampton Court Palace, Londonson of Queen Anne and Prince George
| Never married
| 30 July 1700Windsor Castle, Windsoraged 11
|-
|}

Only styled, 1717

| Prince FrederickHouse of Hanover1717–1726
| 
| 1 February 1707Leineschloss, Hanoverson of King George II and Queen Caroline
| Princess Augusta of Saxe-Gotha17 April 17369 children
| 31 March 1751Leicester House, Londonaged 44
|-
|colspan=5|Prince Frederick became Duke of Edinburgh in 1726 and then Prince of Wales in 1729.|-
|}

Fifth creation, 1928

| Prince HenryHouse of Windsor1928–1974also: Earl of Ulster and Baron Culloden (1928)
| 
| 31 March 1900York Cottage, Sandringhamson of King George V and Queen Mary
| Lady Alice Montagu Douglas Scott6 November 19352 children
| 10 June 1974Barnwell Manor, Barnwellaged 74
|-
| Prince RichardHouse of Windsor1974–presentalso: Earl of Ulster and Baron Culloden (1928)
| 
| 26 August 1944St. Matthew's Nursing Home, Northamptonson of Prince Henry and Princess Alice
| Birgitte van Deurs Henriksen8 June 19723 children
|  now  old
|-
|}

Line of succession

 Prince Henry, Duke of Gloucester (1900–1974)''
 Prince Richard, Duke of Gloucester (born 1944) 
(1) Alexander Windsor, Earl of Ulster (born 1974)
 (2) Xan Windsor, Lord Culloden (born 2007)

Family tree

See also
 List of dukedoms by reign
 Earl of Gloucester

References

External links
 The Duke of Gloucester at the Royal Family website

Dukedoms in the Peerage of the United Kingdom
1385 establishments in England
1928 establishments in the United Kingdom
Noble titles created in 1385
Noble titles created in 1414
Noble titles created in 1461
Noble titles created in 1659
Noble titles created in 1928